Citibank Berhad is a licensed commercial bank operating in Malaysia with its headquarters in Jalan Ampang, Kuala Lumpur. Citibank Berhad operates as a subsidiary of Citigroup Holding (Singapore) Private Limited, commencing its banking operations in Malaysia since 1959. Citibank Berhad was locally incorporated in 1994.

Introduction
Today, Citibank Berhad has 11 branches spread across Kuala Lumpur, Selangor, Penang, Kuantan, Malacca and Johor. It also provides its customers access to cash and a range of banking  services through 11,000 MEPS (Malaysian Electronic Payment System) ATMs covering 2,000 locations nationwide.

Citibank Berhad (Citi) is a universal bank offering a wide range of banking and financial services including retail banking, institutional banking, and investment products and services. It also provides offshore financial services out of its office in Labuan, Malaysia. Citi is the only foreign bank to be rated AAA by the Rating Agency Malaysia for 15 consecutive years.

Citi's Malaysian operations are organized into the following business groupings:

▪ Institutional Clients Group▪ Consumer Banking▪ Cards▪ Wealth Management

Citi is a market leader in credit cards holding the largest market share in sales volume (usage) and receivables, and a dominant share in wealth management. In addition, Citi is the top foreign bank for Corporate FX, cross border Cash Management, e-Payments and institutional investor transactions. Citi is also the number one custodian bank for foreign broker inflows.

Malaysia – Citi's Global Business Hub
Citibank has established strategic centres of excellence providing centralized operations in Kuala Lumpur, Penang and Johor Bahru through Citigroup Transactions Services (M) Sdn Bhd (CTSM, formerly known as Citigroup Trade Services Malaysia) which was incorporated in November 1994.  Through CTSM, Citi became the first bank in Asia to select Malaysia as the location for financial BPO (Business Process Outsourcing) services leveraging upon the availability of a large, skilled, multi-lingual workforce in Malaysia.

The Penang hub is the largest trade processing center in Citi globally and offers operations to support Citi's trade, cash management and commercial cards businesses covering over 100 countries with a corresponding network of 3,300 banks and services Asia, Europe, US, Africa and the Middle East.

The Kuala Lumpur center also handles activities across operations and technology including Anti Money Laundering transaction monitoring to identify and prevent possible money laundering activities; Securities & Funds Services, the "Fraud and Authorization Center of Excellence" and Global System Entitlement Administration.

Malaysia is also the center for Citi's regional trade processing and serves over 25 countries from the region and from as far afield as South Africa, Finland and the Americas.

Personal Banking 

Citi Personal Banking refers to Citi's range of retail and transactional banking products and services. This includes a range of checking account products, savings account products, time deposits, foreign currency products and services, fund transfer services, debit and ATM cards, credit cards, loan products, investment products and services, insurance products and Islamic banking products.

City Priority 

City Priority banking services are available to customers with an average combined account balance of RM100,000 and more. Priority banking customers have access to:▪ A dedicated relationship manager▪ Preferential rates and prices on savings and investments▪ The wealth planning tool, i-Wealth Goal Planner

Citigold 

Citigold represents Citibank Malaysia's top-of-the-line product offering for high net worth customers with "investible assets" of RM350,000 or more. Investible assets represents the money invested in deposits, investments and/or insurance with Citibank.

Citigold customers enjoy significantly more benefits and privileges than are available for normal banking customers. These may include: a complimentary Citibank credit card, exclusive seminars, Citigold market updates, a dedicated relationship manager/team, preferential rates on products and services, Citigold status that carries over to 36 countries, access to a wide selection of investments including funds, currencies, gold, insurance products and market-linked investments from across the globe etc.

History

1959 – 2009 

July 1959 – The First National City Bank, as Citibank was formerly known, opens its first Malaysian branch at Jalan Medan Pasar, Kuala Lumpur with 17 employees.

1965 – Two more branches are added, one at Jalan Ampang in Kuala Lumpur and another at Light Street in Penang.

1982 – The Global Consumer Banking service is launched

1986 – Citibank introduces Citigold, Malaysia's 1st priority banking service for customers with a minimum portfolio of RM200,000.

1987 – CitiPhone Banking service becomes available. Citibank creates another industry first by introducing CitiPhone, a 24-hour phone service seven days a week. With these services, customers are able to call the bank at any time to conduct their banking.

1989 – The first Citibank credit card is issued.

1993 – Citibank is the first bank in Malaysia to launch touch screen and "dip-card" ATMs
Citicorp Trade Services (Malaysia) Sdn Bhd, a regional trade document processing centre using computer imaging technology opens.

1994 – Citibank Berhad locally incorporated on 22 April making it the first American Bank to do so. Citibank's offshore banking unit opened at the Labuan International Offshore Financial Center.

1995 – CitiBusiness for small and medium enterprises is launched.

1996 – Citibank launches CitiService, the 1st bank to introduce a centralized service center for corporate.

1999 – Evergreen Reward Points are introduced for credit card holders.

2000 – Citibank launches the 1st Blue Credit Card for the youth market.
Citibank Johor branch opens – Located at Citi Plaza, Citibank Johor Bahru opens its doors to customers.

2001 – Internet banking services launched.

Consumer and Corporate banking operations brought under one roof at the new HQ, Menara  Citibank on 11 June 2001.

Citibank is the 1st foreign bank to launch CitiDirect for corporates, and subsequently for Securities in the year 2006.

2002 – Citibank is the 1st first bank to introduce Cash Deposit Machines.

	Citibank introduces 1st one-hour card replacement service.

2004 – The first cashback credit card and the Citibank Clear Visa Mini card introduced.

2005 – Citibank is the 1st Foreign Bank to offer GIRO Payment at local bank branches.

Citibank is the 1st bank to introduce multi-bank Internet Payment CitiConnect via Financial Payment Exchange.

Citibank is the 1st custodian bank to provide agency clearing and settlement services to `foreign stock brokers.

2006 – After 47 years, following lifting of restrictions on foreign banks, Citibank opens another four branches throughout Malaysia – Bukit Tengah (Penang), Damansara Perdana (Petaling Jaya), Klang, and Puchong (Selangor) – taking the total number of branches to seven.

Citibank commences Islamic banking through a window and launches its first Islamic banking product, Murabahah Deposit-i with Kuwait Finance House Malaysia Berhad as its first foreign currency Commodity Murabahah inter-bank counter party.  This milestone marks Citigroup as one of the pioneers in the field of Commodity Murabahah, having been one of the earliest institutions to offer the product in the Persian Gulf countries.

Citigroup launches the Dow Jones Citigroup Sukuk Index, the first of its kind to measure the performance of global Islamic bonds (Sukuk).

2007 – Citibank introduces the fuel card, Shell Citibank Credit Card and the travel/air miles card, AirAsia Citibank Credit Card.

Citi launches the 1st global remittance services using the mobile phone for Malaysia – DigiRemit.

Malaysia becomes the 23rd government bond market and one of the two other Asian countries outside Japan to enter the Citigroup World Government Bond Index.

2008 – Citibank partners with Giant to launch the Giant Citibank Credit Card.

Citigold Global Banking, a wealth management service for clients with cross-border needs launched.

Citibank introduces the Citibank Debit & ATM Card.

Citi launches the 1st ever 1-hour card issuance service in Malaysia. The one hour card centre is located at Menara Citibank, Jalan Ampang Kuala Lumpur.

Citibank Berhad is the Principal Adviser and Sole Lead Arranger for Telekom Malaysia Berhad's Islamic Sale and Leaseback transaction that involves the issuance of RM1.0 billion of Islamic Asset Backed Sukuk Ijarah by Menara ABS Berhad (MAB).

CitiConnectSM EPF e-Contribution services and EPF Smart Kiosks is launched. Citibank becomes the first foreign bank in the country to provide CitiConnect EPF e-Contribution services and EPF Smart Kiosks to both its corporate and retail customers respectively. CitiConnectSM, a web-enabled financial services platform was developed by Citi's Global Transaction Services to allow Citibank's corporate clients to submit and pay their employees’ EPF contributions. Simultaneously, Smart Kiosks were set up at Citibank branches in Kuala Lumpur, Penang and Johor Bahru, to enable Citibank customers to check their EPF accounts while conducting banking transactions.

2010 and since 

2010 – Citibank launches industry-first mobile banking platform.

Apr 20, 2010 – Citibank Opens Four New Bank Branches in Taipan USJ, Cheras, Melaka and Kuantan, following the authorization given by Bank Negara Malaysia in 2009, expanding its branch network to eleven from seven.

Sept 23, 2010 – Citigroup Global Markets Malaysia Sdn Bhd, the stockbroking arm of Citigroup commenced equities brokerage operations on Bursa Malaysia.

2011 – Citibank Berhad gains access to local ATM network (MEPs) leveraging on 10,000 ATMs covering 2,000 locations nationwide.

Citibank Berhad opens first-of-its-kind Smart Banking Branch in Malaysia that is also the largest in the Asia Pacific region.

Citi acts as the joint book runner for the Wakala Global Sukuk issued by the Government of Malaysia with a total issuance size of US$2 billion (in two separate tranches).

Launched Rethink Banking proposition for the emerging affluent segment.

Launched AirAsia-Citibank Platinum and Gold credit cards.

2013 – Launched Citibank Express, a Smart Banking machine equipped with an online banking connection, video-conferencing and bio-metric capabilities for customer identity authentication.

Launched CTSM's second premises at One Precinct, Penang, the largest Citigroup regional Trade & Cash processing centers for Transaction services business.

Citi acted as sole international financial adviser to KLCCP on the creation of its Stapled Securities.

2013 – Jan 15 – With the launch of the Citibank Rewards Platinum Card, Citi became the first international bank in Malaysia to pioneer a card that allows customers to customize their rewards and benefits programs.

Mar 04 – Citibank Berhad launched the Citi Prestige Card, Citi's first global credit card that brings global privileges to affluent Malaysians.

May 29 – Citbank Berhad forms alliance with American Express with the launch of the Citi PremierMiles American Express® Card that will also be accepted on the American Express global merchant network.

Operations

Branch Network 
As at 2014, Citibank has 11 branches operational in Malaysia (not including the Labuan offshore banking facility) including a Smart Banking facility at Menara Citibank. Customers can carry out transactions at these branches from Monday to Friday, between 9.30am and 4pm.

ATM Network + MEPS 
Subsequent to becoming the first foreign bank in Malaysia, in 2005, to gain complete access to the Malaysian Electronic Payment System (MEPS) Interbank GIRO, Citibank Berhad signed an agreement in December 2010 with Malaysian Electronic Payment System Sdn Bhd enabling its customers to access to MEPS ATMs nationwide.

As at 2014, Citibank Debit, ATM and Credit cardholders can use their cards at over 11,000 MEPS shared ATMs in Malaysia covering 2000 locations nationwide, in addition to over 1.2 million Citi and Visa Plus ATMs in over 100 countries. Currently, 201 financial institutions, including Citi, are part of the MEPS network. All MEPS ATMs have the MEPS logo displayed on the ATMs.

The current services available at all MEPS shared ATMs include cash withdrawal and balance inquiries. Interbank fund transfers and Credit card/Ready Credit/loan repayments (via interbank funds transfers) are possible only if the respective bank is offering the service via the MEPS shared ATM network.

Banking Beyond Banking Hours 
In order to make banking services available beyond routine banking hours, Citi has enabled banking through the following additional channels:

Phone Banking 
Citibank Berhad's phone banking service, CitiPhone, is available 24 hours a day. CitiPhone service can be accessed with a Telephone PIN. Phone Banking services are available in English, Bahasa and Mandarin.

Customers can choose to carry out a variety of banking transactions either through a "self-service" Interactive Voice Response (IVR) system or by talking to a CitiPhone officer. Transactions that can be carried out include account information, credit limit inquiry, funds transfer, rewards redemption, Telephone PIN generation, E-statement enrolment, SMS alerts, applications, product inquiries and reporting lost or stolen cards.

Online & Mobile Banking 
Citi provides a secure website for conducting banking transactions online. Additionally, online banking services can also be accessed through mobile devices. Citi provides mobile banking services.

Flood relief program 
During the 2021 December floods, Citi Malaysia offered relief assistance through measures such as deferment of loan payments and waiver of certain fees/charges to assist customers impacted by the recent floods across Malaysia.

References

External links
 Company Overview of Citibank Berhad, bloomberg.com

Banks of Malaysia
Banks established in 1994
1994 establishments in Malaysia
Citigroup
Malaysian subsidiaries of foreign companies
Privately held companies of Malaysia